Iliana de la Vega is a Mexican-born American chef and restaurateur who won the 2022 James Beard Best Chef in Texas Award. In 2019, she was a semifinalist for the Best Chef Southwest award.

The Mexican Government gave her the Ohtli Award in 2014.

Biography

De La Vega grew up in Mexico City.

Career
She moved to her mother's hometown of Oaxaca in 1997 where she opened El Naranjo. In 2012, she opened a location in Austin, Texas.

De La Vega served as the Mexican/Latin Cuisines Specialist for the Culinary Institute of America from 2007 until 2012. At the San Antonio campus, “she conducted research, developed curricula and taught undergraduate, graduate and continuing education courses on Mexican and other Latin cuisines while creating and launching the Latin Cuisines Certificate Program.”

With her daughter Isabel, she began Mexican Culinary Traditions which offers cooking classes amd guided tours.

References

American women chefs
American women restaurateurs
James Beard Foundation Award winners
Chefs from Mexico City
Restaurant founders
Mexican emigrants to the United States
Ohtli Award winners
Culinary Institute of America people